Reekie Linn is a waterfall on the River Isla in Angus in Scotland. Located a short 5-minute walk from the public car park north side of Bridge of Craigisla. Continue past fall to the turn to get a portrait view of the falls.

See also
Waterfalls of Scotland

References

See also
Waterfalls of Scotland

Waterfalls of Perth and Kinross